Lecithocera fascicula is a moth in the family Lecithoceridae first described by Kyu-Tek Park in 1999. It is found in Taiwan.

The wingspan is 14 mm. The forewings are relatively narrow. The ground color is yellowish-white, with brown scales irregularly scattered, especially near apex. There are two well defined dark discal spots, the outer one being much larger and elongated vertically. The hindwings are pale grey.

Etymology
The species name is derived from the Latin fascis (meaning bundle, packet).

References

Moths described in 1999
fascicula